National Hope (Ethniki Elpida) is a Greek monarchist political party with no MPs in the Greek Parliament.

Electoral history
The party was banned by the Supreme Court from participating in the elections of May 2012, but were permitted to stand in the June 2012 election, where it received 4,303 votes (0.07%).

In the election of January 2015 and the election of September 2015, the party's participation was rejected for the second and third time.

Election results

Hellenic Parliament

References

Nationalist parties in Greece
Conservative parties in Greece
Monarchism in Greece
Monarchist parties in Greece
Eastern Orthodox political parties